Calytrix strigosa is a species of plant in the myrtle family Myrtaceae that is endemic to Western Australia.

Description
It usually blooms between August and November producing pink-purple and yellow star-shaped flowers.

Taxonomy
The plant was first described by Alan Cunningham in 1834.

The epithet, strigosa, is a  Botanical Latin adjective describing the sepals of the plant as having "straight rigid close-pressed rather short bristle-like hairs"..

Distribution
Found on sand dunes and sand plains in a large area from the Mid West extending into the Wheatbelt and the Swan Coastal Plain where it grows in sandy lateritic soils.

References

strigosa
Endemic flora of Western Australia
Myrtales of Australia
Rosids of Western Australia
Plants described in 1834
Taxa named by Allan Cunningham (botanist)